Trevor Lloyd may refer to:

 Trevor Lloyd (artist) (1863–1937), New Zealand artist, illustrator and cartoonist
 Trevor Lloyd (geographer) (1906–1995), Canadian geographer, Hans Egede Medal and Massey Medal recipient
 Trevor Lloyd (rugby union) (born 1924), former Wales international rugby union player
 Trevor Lloyd (priest) (born 1938), Anglican priest and author
 Trevor Lloyd (footballer) (born 1952),  Australian rules football player for Fitzroy